Alexander David Kirilloff (born November 9, 1997) is an American professional baseball outfielder and first baseman for the Minnesota Twins of Major League Baseball (MLB). He made his MLB debut in 2020.

Amateur career
Kirilloff played baseball at Plum High School in Plum, Pennsylvania, but did not attend classes there. He is a 2016 graduate of the Pennsylvania Cyber Charter School, which is an online public charter school based out of Midland, Pennsylvania. He played the outfield, first base, and was a pitcher. In only 24 games with Plum High School, Kirilloff batted .563 with 28 runs batted in (RBIs) and four home runs. As a pitcher, he had an 8–0 win–loss record with a 0.74 earned run average (ERA). During the summer of 2015 he played in the Perfect Game All-American Classic at Petco Park and won the event's home run derby. Kirilloff committed to Liberty University to play college baseball, but ultimately ended up choosing to begin his professional baseball career.

Professional career
Kirilloff was selected 15th overall in the first round by the Minnesota Twins in the 2016 MLB draft. Kirilloff spent his first professional season with the Elizabethton Twins where he hit .306/.341/.454 with seven home runs, nine doubles, and 33 RBIs in 55 games, which earned him Appalachian League MVP honors.  His season was cut short with a partial ligament tear in his elbow, and he tried to avoid surgery, receiving platelet-rich plasma therapy. It was eventually deemed necessary that Kirilloff undergo Tommy John surgery, forcing him to miss all of 2017. He returned in 2018 with the Cedar Rapids Kernels before being promoted to the Fort Myers Miracle in June. In 130 games between the two clubs, he slashed .348/.392/.578 with twenty home runs and 101 RBIs.

Kirilloff began 2019 with the Pensacola Blue Wahoos on the injured list with a wrist injury. For the season, he played in 94 games, slashing .283/.343/.413 with nine home runs and 43 RBIs. He was selected to play in the Arizona Fall League for the Salt River Rafters following the season.

The Twins selected Kirilloff's contract on September 29, 2020, ahead of the 2020 American League Wild Card Series against the Houston Astros. He made his major league debut the next day as the starting rightfielder, going 1-for-4 with a single as the Twins were eliminated. 

On July 21, 2021, it was announced that Kirilloff would undergo season-ending  surgery to repair a torn ligament in his right wrist.

Personal life
Kirilloff and his wife, Jordan, had their first child, a daughter, in February 2020. Their second daughter was born in late 2021.

References

External links

1997 births
Living people
Baseball players from Pittsburgh
Major League Baseball outfielders
Minnesota Twins players
Elizabethton Twins players
Cedar Rapids Kernels players
Fort Myers Miracle players
Pensacola Blue Wahoos players